The military ranks of Kuwait are the military insignia used by the Kuwait Military Forces. Kuwait shares a rank structure similar to that of the United Kingdom.

Commissioned officer ranks
The rank insignia of commissioned officers.

Other ranks
The rank insignia of non-commissioned officers and enlisted personnel.

References

External links
 

Kuwait
Military of Kuwait
Kuwait